Byron Keith Smith (born December 21, 1962) is a former American football defensive lineman who played two seasons with the Indianapolis Colts of the National Football League (NFL). He was drafted by the Colts in the third round of the 1984 NFL Supplemental Draft. He played college football at the University of California, Berkeley and attended Canoga Park High School in Canoga Park, Los Angeles.

References

External links
Just Sports Stats

1962 births
Living people
Players of American football from Los Angeles
American football defensive ends
California Golden Bears football players
Indianapolis Colts players